A passenger service unit (PSU) is an aircraft component situated above each row in the overhead panel above the passenger seats in the cabin of airliners. Among other things, a PSU contains reading lights, loudspeakers for announcements, illuminated signs (to remind people that the aircraft is a no-smoking zone and to wear a seatbelt), buttons to call for assistance (though these are mounted on the armrest on some aircraft), air condition vents, and automatically deployed oxygen masks in case of cabin depressurisation. These are not found on the smallest of feederliners, or on older aircraft. 

Safety equipment
Aircraft cabin components